Hassan Karimou (born 1959) is a Nigerien long-distance runner. He competed in the men's marathon at the 1988 Summer Olympics.

References

1959 births
Living people
Athletes (track and field) at the 1988 Summer Olympics
Nigerien male long-distance runners
Nigerien male marathon runners
Olympic athletes of Niger
Place of birth missing (living people)